The twenty-fourth series of the British reality television programme The Only Way Is Essex began airing on 17 March 2019 with a special episode as the cast visited Thailand. Ahead of the series, it was announced that a large number of cast members had quit the series or had been axed from the show. These include Adam Oukhello, Chloe Lewis, Chris and Jon Clark, Dean Ralph, James Argent, Jordan Wright and Myles Barnett. Original cast member Lauren Pope also quit the show before the launch, despite appearing in promo images for the new series. The new cast members replacing them were Chloe and Clare Brockett, Chloe Ross, Ella Wise, Harry Lee, Jayden Beales, Joey Turner, Kelsey Stratford and Tom McDonnell. Despite announcements that Amber Turner and Gemma Collins would not be returning for this series, they both made appearances. Former cast members and Love Island winners Cara De La Hoyde and Nathan Massey also made a brief appearance during this series.

The series focused on the feud between childhood friends Chloe B, Ella and Kelsey, a love triangle between Shelby, Sam and Tom, as well as the brief relationship between Chloe S and Dan until his ex-girlfriend Amber returned to throw a spanner in the works. It also focused on Bobby attempting to put a stop to homophobic abuse online, and Pete and Liam putting the past behind them to become friends again.

Cast

Episodes

{| class="wikitable plainrowheaders" style="width:100%; background:#fff;"
! style="background:#A62C03;"| Seriesno.
! style="background:#A62C03;"| Episodeno.
! style="background:#A62C03;"| Title
! style="background:#A62C03;"| Original air date
! style="background:#A62C03;"| Duration
! style="background:#A62C03;"| UK viewers

|}

Reception

Ratings
Catch-up service totals were added to the official ratings.

References

The Only Way Is Essex
2019 British television seasons